Stephen Holyday is a Canadian politician who has served on Toronto City Council since 2014. He is currently the deputy speaker and represents Ward 2 Etobicoke Centre. He was first elected in the old Ward 3 Etobicoke Centre during the 2014 municipal election.

Background
Holyday was born in Toronto, Ontario. He is the son of Doug Holyday who previously represented the ward, served as Mayor of Etobicoke, and was briefly a member of Provincial Parliament (MPP). He and his wife Margaret have three children.

Alex Bozikovic, The Globe and Mail's architecture critic, called Holyday "furiously anti-development". He has also been described as one of "three Toronto councillors hopelessly exacerbating the housing crisis" by More Neighbours Toronto.

Election results

References

Living people
Ontario civil servants
Toronto Metropolitan University alumni
People from Etobicoke
Toronto city councillors
1976 births